Audrey Elizabeth Callaghan, Baroness Callaghan of Cardiff (28 July 1915 – 15 March 2005) was the wife of British Labour prime minister James Callaghan. She served as a Labour councillor and later became a campaigner and fundraiser for children's health and welfare.

Early life
She was born in Maidstone, Kent, where her father was a director of the Lead Wool Company, a tool company. Callaghan was educated at Maidstone Grammar School for Girls, then studied cookery at Battersea College of Domestic Science. She would chair the Maidstone Labour Party and Fabian Society. She joined the Labour Party while in her teens and met her future husband in the early 1930s at the Baptist church Sunday school where they both worked, then at the Labour Party, but they did not marry until 28 July 1938, her 23rd birthday. They honeymooned in Paris and Chamonix, and then returned to rent a house in Norwood.

She worked as a dietician at an antenatal clinic in Greenwich during the Second World War, a young mother herself. At the same time, she studied economics at a University of London extension course in Eltham, with future Labour Party leader Hugh Gaitskell as tutor. She made a special study of malnutrition in children and its remedies.

Career
Her husband James had been elected a Member of Parliament for Cardiff in 1945 and she was at his side throughout his career. She was somewhat derided, described as "the Yorkshire Pudding", ostensibly for her skill in cooking, but also as a reference to her perceived poor dress sense and mildly disorganised appearance; she was ridiculed for her hobby of keeping pigs. Audrey remained very private, and shunned the limelight. However, she was engaged with her husband's jobs and was said to be instrumental in dissuading him from resignation after the 1967 devaluation of the pound.

In 1958, Audrey was elected as the Labour member for Lewisham North for the London County Council. She took a special interest in children's homes and the Children's Committee. She was an alderman of the Greater London Council from 1964 and became chairman of Lewisham Council's children's committee, where she was also an alderman, when the GLC was abolished.

In 1969, Callaghan became the chair of the board of governors of Great Ormond Street Hospital for Sick Children.  She continued raising funds for the hospital for the next thirty years, most notably securing an extension of copyright on Peter Pan for the hospital by a Lords amendment moved by her husband.

In 1987, when James was created Baron Callaghan of Cardiff, she became Lady Callaghan. She herself declined a damehood from Prime Minister Margaret Thatcher. They retired to a farm in Ringmer, East Sussex, where she kept pigs and he kept cows and sheep, and grew barley. Along with her husband, she supported causes relating to the University College of Swansea, of which James Callaghan was president.

During her eighties, Callaghan developed Alzheimer's disease. In July 2001, when her condition had deteriorated, she entered a care home where her husband visited her every day until her death in March 2005, by which time they had been married for 66 years and together for well over 70. James Callaghan died on 26 March 2005, eleven days after Audrey's death, and the day before his 93rd birthday.

Personal life
She had three children: Margaret Jay, Baroness Jay of Paddington, Julia and Michael.

References

1915 births
2005 deaths
Callaghan of Cardiff
Councillors in Greater London
Deaths from dementia in the United Kingdom
Deaths from Alzheimer's disease
Dietitians
English Baptists
James Callaghan
Labour Party (UK) councillors
Members of London County Council
Members of the Greater London Council
People educated at Maidstone Grammar School for Girls
People from Maidstone
People from Ringmer
Spouses of life peers
Spouses of prime ministers of the United Kingdom
Wives of knights
Women councillors in England